Jinan Qingqi Motorcycle Co., Ltd  is a Chinese manufacturer of mopeds, quadbikes and other small engined & electric motorcycles that was founded in 1956. The company headquarters is located in Jinan, Shandong Province. Qingqi is probably the best known moped brand in modern China and the company is one of the larger manufacturers of small engine motorcycles in the world, but is almost completely unknown outside its domestic market, it is however a large original equipment manufacturer provider to companies such as Cycle Union, Suzuki and Peugeot. In the case of the latter two companies that has eventually lead to the formation of joint ventures including JQ/Suzuki venture called Plum Qingqi Motors company that is based in Pakistan and also trades using the Qingqi trademark. The company also manufactures 125cc motorcycles for Mash.

References

External links
Jinan Qingqi official website
 Jinan Qingqi Page at Alibaba.com
Plum Qingqi Motors
Jinan Qingqi Electric Vehicle Co., Ltd.

Moped manufacturers
Motorcycle manufacturers of China
Vehicle manufacturing companies established in 1956
Chinese companies established in 1956
Companies based in Jinan